The Narrow Corner is a 1933 American pre-Code drama film directed by Alfred E. Green and starring Douglas Fairbanks Jr., Patricia Ellis and Ralph Bellamy. It is an adaptation of Somerset Maugham's 1932 novel The Narrow Corner. It was remade in 1936 as Isle of Fury.

The film's sets were designed by the art director Robert M. Haas.

Synopsis
A fugitive Englishman, wanted for murder, ends up in the Dutch East Indies.

Cast
 Douglas Fairbanks Jr. as Fred Blake  
 Patricia Ellis as Louise Frith  
 Ralph Bellamy as Eric Whittenson  
 Dudley Digges as Doctor Saunders  
 Arthur Hohl as Captain Nichols  
 Reginald Owen as Mr. Frith  
 Henry Kolker as Mr. Blake, Fred's Father  
 William V. Mong as Jack Swan  
 Willie Fung as Ah Kay, Saunder's Servant  
 Sidney Toler as Ryan, the Go-Between

References

Bibliography
 Samuel J. Rogal. A William Somerset Maugham Encyclopedia. Greenwood Publishing, 1997.

External links
 

1933 films
1933 drama films
American drama films
Films directed by Alfred E. Green
Warner Bros. films
American black-and-white films
Films based on British novels
Films based on works by W. Somerset Maugham
1930s English-language films
1930s American films
Films scored by Bernhard Kaun
English-language drama films